The Soka Gakkai Italian Buddhist Institute is the Italian branch of the Soka Gakkai International Nichiren Buddhist organisation. The Soka Gakkai Italian Buddhist Institute is popularly known by the acronyms SGI-Italia, SGI-Italy, and SGI-I.

Prior to 1998, the SGI-Italy was known as the Soka Gakkai Italian Association, which had been active in Italy since the late 1970s.

In June 2015, the SGI-Italy was recognized by the Italian government with a special accord under Italian Constitution Article 8, acknowledging it as an official religion of Italy and eligible to receive direct taxpayer funding for its religious and social activities. It also recognizes the Soka Gakkai as a "Concordat" (It: "Intesa") that grants the religions status in "a special 'club' of denominations consulted by the government in certain occasions, allowed to appoint chaplains in the army - a concordat is not needed for appointing chaplains in hospitals and jails - and, perhaps more importantly, to be partially financed by taxpayers' money." Eleven other religious denominations share this status.

In August 2015, Italian newspaper la Repubblica reported that 75,000 Italian citizens are SGI-Italia members, which accounts for half of the Buddhist population of Italy.

See also
Buddhism in Italy

References

External links
sgi-italia.org – Official website of the SGI-Italy

Italian Buddhist Institute
Buddhist organisations based in Italy
Religious organizations established in 1985
1985 establishments in Italy